Harkány is a town in Baranya county, Hungary.

History
The area has been inhabited since medieval times, the name "Nagh Harkan" was mentioned in a document from the year 1323. The origin and meaning of the name harkány is unknown, but there are archaeological findings showing that the area was inhabited by Huns and Avars about 1000 years ago. Until the end of World War II, the majority of the Inhabitants was Danube Swabians, also called locally as Stifolder, because there Ancestors once came at the 17th century and 18th century from Fulda (district). Mostly of the former German Settlers was expelled to Allied-occupied Germany and Allied-occupied Austria in 1945–1948, about the Potsdam Agreement.
Only a few Germans of Hungary live there, the majority today are the descendants of Hungarians from the Czechoslovak–Hungarian population exchange. They occupied the houses of the former Danube Swabians Inhabitants.

Spa
Medical waters rich in sulfur were discovered by Pogány János in 1823, a well digger who sensed the warm waters had a good effect on his ill leg.

The medical benefits of the waters are proved in treatment of locomotor disorders, chronic gynaecological inflammations and lymphatic malfunctions and for psoriasis.

The spa is located in a huge 13.5-hectare primeval park, among hundreds of years old trees, where it awaits visitors who want to relax with a beach bath, spa and slide park. In addition to healing skin diseases, the bath water is also excellent for treating infertility problems.

Tourism
Since the discovery of the medical waters 150 years ago, the number of tourists visiting the spa of Harkány has reached one million people yearly.
Harkány is one of the most famous city spas; a lot of places of accommodation and recreation have been built. Most of the hotels are of European standards.
Harkány has a hospital for treatment of rheumatic related illnesses.

Twin towns – sister cities
Harkány is twinned with:
  Băile Tușnad, Romania
  Bačko Petrovo Selo, Serbia

References

External links

  in Hungarian, English, German, Croatian, Czech and Russian
 Harkány at funiq.hu 
 Additional information about Harkany Thermal Spa

Populated places in Baranya County
Thermal baths in Hungary